The Misleading Lady is a 1916 American silent comedy-drama film directed by Arthur Berthelet and starring Henry B. Walthall, Edna Mayo and Sidney Ainsworth. It is an adaptation of the play of the same title by Paul Dickey and Charles W. Goddard which has been made into films on several occasions. It marked the screen debut of Edward Arnold.

Cast
 Henry B. Walthall as Jack Craiger 
 Edna Mayo as Helen Steele 
 Sidney Ainsworth as Henry Tracey 
 Edward Arnold as Sidney Parker 
 Harry Dunkinson as Boney 
 John Junior as Keen Fitzpatrick 
 John Cossar as John W. Cannell 
 Charles J. Stine as Innkeeper 
 Grant Mitchell as Stephen Weatherbee 
 Renee Clemmons as Jane Wentworth 
 Frances Raymond as Mrs. Cannell

References

Bibliography
 Goble, Alan. The Complete Index to Literary Sources in Film. Walter de Gruyter, 1999.

External links

1916 films
1916 comedy-drama films
Silent American comedy-drama films
Films directed by Arthur Berthelet
American silent feature films
1910s English-language films
American black-and-white films
Essanay Studios films
1910s American films